Augustine, born Adam Ivanovich Markevich (Belarusian: Аўгусціна/Адам Іванавіч Маркевіч) on April 7, 1952, in the Gomel Oblast, is a Belarusian metropolitan bishop of the diocese of Belotserkovsky and Boguslavsky under the semi-autonomous Ukrainian Orthodox Church. He also served as bishop of the Lviv and Drohobych (changed to Lviv and Galicia in 1998) diocese from September 16, 1993, until being transmigrated to the diocese at Belotserkovsky and Boguslavsky on July 20, 2012, where he continues to serve today. He holds Ukrainian, Belarusian, and Russian citizenship, but resides with his diocese in Ukraine.

Early life and education 
Markevich was born on April 7, 1952, in the Byelorussian SSR to what Markevich describes as "a priestly family", and in 1955 his father became a priest in Zhytomyr. His paternal grandfather was a soldier of the Red Army and had been killed during the Great Patriotic War. He graduated from high school in 1969, and studied medicine until 1971 when he graduated from medical school and moved to Ukraine to began working as a paramedic in Rivne during which time he began studying theology at the Moscow Theological Academy. He obtained his doctorate in theology from the university in 1982.

Clerical life 
Markevich was ordained as a deacon and took the monastic vows in 1975, and a year later in 1976 was ordained as a presbyter by Metropolitan Vladimir of Dmitrov. From 1978 to 1992, he served priestly duties in Korosten, until he was anointed Bishop of Lviv and Drohobych on September 16, 1993. In 1996, he became an ambassador for the Ukrainian Orthodox Church to the Ukrainian Armed Forces, a position he still holds today. In 1998, he was elevated to the rank of archbishop. In 2011, he consecrated the St. Volodymr Chapel in Antarctica. He was transmigrated to the diocese of Belotserkovsky and Boguslavsky on July 20, 2012, and was granted the rank of metropolitan a year later on November 23, 2013.

References 

Living people
1952 births
Metropolitan bishops of the Ukrainian Orthodox Church (Moscow Patriarchate)
People from Gomel Region
Byelorussian Soviet Socialist Republic people
Eastern Orthodox deacons
People from Korosten